The 2005 Vuelta a Murcia was the 21st professional edition of the Vuelta a Murcia cycle race and was held on 2 March to 6 March 2005. The race started and finished in Murcia. The race was won by Koldo Gil.

General classification

References

2005
2005 in road cycling
2005 in Spanish sport